Betty and Wilbur Davis State Park is a  state park located in Otsego County, New York. The park is southeast of Cooperstown and is in the northwest corner of the Town of Westford.

The park is named for the New York couple who donated the land, and features forests, open land and two ponds.

Facilities 
Betty and Wilbur Davis State Park was opened in 2001, and fully furnished log cabins were added in 2006. The park also features picnic tables and pavilion, ponds for catch and release fishing, hiking trails, and hunting in season. During the winter, the park is available for cross-country skiing and snowshoeing.

See also 
 List of New York state parks

References

External links
 New York State Parks - Betty and Wilbur Davis
 Betty and Wilbur Davis State Park trail map

State parks of New York (state)
Parks in Otsego County, New York
Protected areas established in 2001
2001 establishments in New York (state)